Columbia Heights is a Washington Metro station in Washington, D.C., on the Green and Yellow Lines. Due to successful redevelopment since the station's opening, Columbia Heights is one of the busiest Metro stops outside the downtown core, with over four million exits in 2010.

The station is located in Northwest Washington at 14th and Irving Streets (entrances at both the Southwest and Northeast corners), serving both the Columbia Heights and Mount Pleasant neighborhoods. It is also close to the Adams Morgan neighborhood. Service began on September 18, 1999.

Station layout

The station has an island platform located underneath 14th Street, with an entrance at the intersection with Irving Street.

Public art
Installed in 1999, Woven Identities is a mural and wall sculpture located in the Metro station. Installed as part of the DC Commission on the Arts and Humanities public art agenda the piece was created by D.C. architect Meghan Walsh, AIA and youth from Casa Del Pueblo Community Center. A series of painted panels, which appear like mosaics, the mural is abstract featuring faces representing the diversity of the Columbia Heights neighborhood. Neon lights of many colors glow from behind the framed painted mosaics.

References

External links

 The Schumin Web Transit Center: Columbia Heights Station
 Irving Street west entrance from Google Maps Street View
 Irving Street east entrance from Google Maps Street View

1999 establishments in Washington, D.C.
Black people in art
Columbia Heights, Washington, D.C.
Stations on the Green Line (Washington Metro)
Public art in Washington, D.C.
Railway stations located underground in Washington, D.C.
Railway stations in the United States opened in 1999
Washington Metro stations in Washington, D.C.
Stations on the Yellow Line (Washington Metro)